MOJO TV is a satellite news network in Telugu Language owned by Media NXT India Private Limited founded on 2016

History

MOJO TV with a tagline of
! (Prasniddam…Poradudam!), literally translating as 'to Question & to fight' launched on AIR from May 1, 2018. It is a free to air channel available for downlink on IntelSat 20 68.5o E, Downlink Frequency 3732.5 MHz, Symbol Rate - 7.2 msps, FEC ¾, Modulation - 8 PSK MPEG4, Polarization (RX) - Vertical, Service ID - 8, Video PID - 208 & Audio PID - 308.

Programming

The channel airs shows like Mojo Masti, Tech 360, Super Prime Time With Raghu, Spotlight, Line Of Fire, MOJO Trends, and The Real Politics.

References

Telugu-language television channels
Television stations in Hyderabad